Margaret Ludwig (November 3, 1933 – December 2, 2017) was an American politician who served in the Maine Senate from the 3rd district from 1986 to 1994.

She died on December 2, 2017, in Houlton, Maine at age 84.

References

1933 births
2017 deaths
Republican Party Maine state senators
People from Houlton, Maine
Women state legislators in Maine
21st-century American women